This is a list of viceroys of Sicily:

Aragonese direct rule 1409–1516
 John of Aragon, Duke of Peñafiel, later king John II of Aragon, 1458–1479, acted 1409–1416.
 Domingo Ram y Lanaja, Bishop of Lleida 1416–1419
 Antonio de Cardona 1419–1421 (1st term)
 Giovanni de Podio 1421–1422
 Niccolò Speciale 1423–1424 (1st term)
 Peter, infans of Aragón 1424–1425
 Giovanni I Ventimiglia, count-marquis of Geraci 1430–1432
 Niccolò Speciale 1425–1431 (2nd term subordinately at Peter of Aragon and Giovanni Ventimiglia)
 Pedro Felice and Adamo Asmundo 1432–1433
 direct rule of King Alfonso V 1433–1435
 Ruggero Paruta 1435–1439
 Bernat de Requesens 1439–1440 (1st term)
 Gilabert de Centelles y de Cabrera 1440–1441
 Raimundo Perellós 1441–1443
 Lope Ximénez de Urrea y de Bardaixi 1443–1459 (1st term)
 Juan de Moncayo 1459–1463
 Bernat de Requesens 1463–1465 (2nd term)
 Lope Ximénez de Urrea y de Bardaixi 1465–1475 (2nd term)
 Guillm Pujades 1475–1477
 Joan Ramon Folc III de Cardona, Count of Prades 1477–1479
 Gaspar de Espés, Viceroy of Sicily 1479–1489, Count of Sclafana,(Sicily), Lord of Albalate de Cinca (Spain).
 Fernando de Acuña y de Herrera 1489–1495
 Juan de Lanuza y Pimentel 1495–1507. Died in Naples, Italy, 1507.
 Ramon de Cardona, Count of Albento 1507–1509
 Hug de Montcada 1509–1517

Spanish direct rule, 1516–1713
 Ettore Pignatelli e Caraffa, 1st Duke of Monteleone, Duke of Monteleone 1517–1534
 Simone Ventimiglia, Marquis of Geraci 1534–1535 Interim
 Ferrante Gonzaga, Prince of Molfetta 1535–1546
 Ambrogio Santapace, Marquis of Licodia 1546–1547 Interim
 Juan de Vega, Lord of Grajal 1547–1557
 Juan de la Cerda, 4th Duke of Medinaceli 1557–1564
 García Álvarez de Toledo, 4th Marquis of Villafranca 1564–1566
 Carlo d'Aragona Tagliavia 1566–1568 Interim  (1st term)
 Francesco Ferdinando II d'Avalos, 5th Marquis of Pescara, 1568–1571
 Giuseppe Francesco Landriano, Count of Landriano 1571 Interim
 Carlo d'Aragona Tagliavia, 1571–1577 Interim (2nd term)
 Marcantonio Colonna, Prince of Paliano 1577–1584
 Juan Alfonso Bisbal, Count of Briático 1584–1585 Interim
 Diego Enríquez de Guzmán, Count of Alba de Liste 1585–1592
 Enrique de Guzmán, 2nd Count of Olivares 1592–1595
 Giovanni III Ventimiglia, 8th Marquis of Geraci, and Prince of Castelbuono, 1595–1598 Interim (1st term)
 Bernardino de Cárdenas y Portugal, Duke of Maqueda 1598–1601
 Jorge de Cárdenas y Manrique de Lara, Marquis of Elche 1601–1602 Interim
 Lorenzo Suárez de Figueroa y Córdoba, Duke of Feria 1602–1606
 Giovanni III Ventimiglia, 8th Marquis of Geraci and Prince of Castelbuono,  1606–1607 Interim (2nd term)
 Juan Fernandez Pacheco, 5th Duke of Escalona 1607–1610
 Giovanni Doria, Cardinal 1610–1611 Interim (1st term)
 Pedro Téllez-Girón, 3rd Duke of Osuna 1611–1616
 Francisco Ruiz de Castro  1616–1622
 Emanuel Filibert of Savoy 1622–1624
 Giovanni Doria, Cardinal 1624–1626 (2nd term)
 Antonio Pimentel y Toledo, Marquis of Tavora 1626–1627
 Enrique Pimentel, Count of Villalba, 1627
 Francisco de la Cueva, 7th Duke of Alburquerque 1627–1632
 Fernando Afán de Ribera y Enríquez, Duke of Alcalá 1632–1635
 Luis de Moncada, 7th Duke of Montalto,  1635–1639 Interim
 Francisco de Melo, Marquis of Villanueva, 1639–1641
 Juan Alfonso Enríquez de Cabrera 1641–1644
 Pedro Fajardo Requesens y Zúñiga, Marquis of los Vélez 1644–1647
 Vicente de Guzmán, Marquis of Montealegre 1647 Interim
 Gian Giacomo Teodoro Trivulzio, Cardinal 1647–1649
 John of Austria the Younger 1649–1651
 Rodrigo de Sandoval y Mendoza, 7th Duke of Infantado 1651–1655
 Juan Tellez-Girón y Enriquez de Ribera, 4th Duke of Osuna 1655–1656
 Martín de Redín 1656–1657
 Pedro Rubeo 1657–1660 Interim
 Fernando de Ayala, Count of Ayala 1660–1663
 Francesco Caetani, 8th Duke of Sermoneta, 1663–1667
 Francisco Fernández de la Cueva, 8th Duke of Alburquerque 1667–1670
 Claude Lamoral, Prince of Ligne 1670–1674
 Francisco Bazán de Benavides 1674 Interim
 Fadrique de Toledo y Osorio, Marquis of Villafranca del Bierzo 1674–1676
 Anielo de Guzmán, Marquis of Castel Rodrigo 1676–77
 Eleanor de Moura, Marquise of Castel Rodrigo 1677 Interim
 Luis Manuel Fernández de Portocarrero, Cardinal 1677–1678 Interim
 Vicente de Gonzaga y Doria 1678
 Francisco de Benavides, Count of Santisteban 1678–1687
 Juan Francisco Pacheco y Téllez-Girón, 4th Consort Duke of Uceda 1687–1696
 Pedro Manuel Colón de Portugal y de la Cueva, 1696–1701, 7th Duke of Veragua from 1673 to 1710 .
 Juan Manuel Fernández Pacheco, 8th Marquis of Villena, Duke of Escalona 1701–1702
 Francesco Del Giudice, Cardinal 1702–1705 Interim
 Isidoro de la Cueva y Benavides, Marquis of Bedmar 1705–1707
 Carlo Antonio Spinola, 4th Marquis of the Balbases 1707–1713

At the end of the War of the Spanish Succession, by the Treaty of Utrecht (1713), Sicily was ceded to the Duke of Savoy.

House of Savoy, 1713–1720

 Annibale Maffei, Count 1714–1718
 Giovan Francesco di Bette, Marquis of Lede 1718–1719
 Niccolò Pignatelli, Duke of Monteleone 1719–1720

The Spanish invaded the kingdom in 1718 during the War of the Quadruple Alliance. The Duke of Savoy ceded it to Austria in 1720 by the Treaty of The Hague.

Austrian direct rule, 1720–1734
 Joaquín Fernández de Portocarrero, Marquis of Almenara, 1722–1728
 Cristoforo Fernandez de Cordoba, Count of Sastago 1728–1734

Conquered by the Spanish in 1734 during the War of the Polish Succession, the kingdom was ceded to Charles I, Duke of Parma, a son of the King of Spain.

House of Bourbon, 1734–1816
 José Carrillo de Albornoz, 1st Duke of Montemar 1734–1737
 Bartolomeo Corsini, Prince of Sismano 1737–1747
 Jacques-Eustache de La Viefville, Duke of La Viefville 1747–1754
 Giovanni Fogliani Sforza d'Aragona, Marquis of Pellegrino 1755–1775
 Marcantonio Colonna, Prince of Stigliano 1775–1781
 Domenico Caracciolo, Marquis of Villamaina 1781–1786
 Francesco d'Aquino, Prince of Caramanico 1786–1795
 Francisco Lopez y Rojo, Archbishop of Palermo 1795–1798
 Tommaso Firrao di Luzzi, Prince of Sant'Agata 1798–1802
 Cardinal Domenico Pignatelli di Belmonte, Archbishop of Palermo 1802–1803
 Alessandro Filangieri, Prince of Cutò 1803–1806
 direct rule of King Ferdinand III 1806–1813
 Lieutenant-General: Francis, Duke of Calabria 1813–1816
 Lieutenant-General: Niccolò Filangieri, Prince of Cutò 1816

In 1816 the Kingdom of Naples and the Kingdom of Sicily were merged into the new Kingdom of the Two Sicilies.

References

Time of the Viceroys

 GIUSEPPE GALASSO, born 1929. Il Regno di Napoli. Il Mezzogiorno angioino e aragonese (1266-1494), Utet, Torino 1992,  xv, 919 pages. : ill. ; 26 cm.,  . Series Storia d'Italia (Unione tipografico-editrice torinese) ; v. 15, t. 1. (In Italian), covers also Spanish time in Naples.